The Roman Catholic Diocese of Maturín is a diocese located in the city of Maturín in the Ecclesiastical province of Ciudad Bolívar in Venezuela.

History
On 24 May 1958 Pope Pius XII established the Diocese of Maturín from the Diocese of Ciudad Bolívar.

Ordinaries
Antonio José Ramírez Salaverría (24 May 1958 – 7 May 1994)
Diego Rafael Padrón Sánchez (7 May 1994 – 27 Mar 2002) Appointed, Archbishop of Cumaná
Enrique Pérez Lavado (9 Aug 2003 – present)

See also
Roman Catholicism in Venezuela

References

External links
 GCatholic.org
 Catholic Hierarchy 
 Official Website

Roman Catholic dioceses in Venezuela
Roman Catholic Ecclesiastical Province of Ciudad Bolívar
Christian organizations established in 1958
Roman Catholic dioceses and prelatures established in the 20th century
1958 establishments in Venezuela
Maturín